Yotuel Omar Romero Manzanares (born October 6, 1976), mononymously known as Yotuel, is a Cuban singer, actor, and current lead singer and co-writer of the 2003 Latin Grammy Award-winning Platinum album-selling rap group Orishas. Among other recordings, Emigrante won the 2003 Latin Grammy Award for Best Rap/Hip-Hop Album. This same album was also nominated for the 2003 Grammy Award for Best Latin Rock/Alternative Album.

Life

Yotuel was born in Havana into an Afro-Cuban family. His name is a combination of three Spanish pronouns yo, tú and él (I, you, and he). His parents could not agree on a name so they decided to combine all 3 pronouns. He has developed a performing arts career and is a Cuban expatriate.

Career

Yotuel began performing rap music early in life. When he was 18 years old he got together with his friend Hiram Riveri (aka Ruzzo) and Joel Pando and all three started a rap group called Amenaza (Menace). Having any success as a rap artist in Cuba proved difficult so he also started acting in theatre and television and doing some modelling work. During the year 1996 Liván Nuñez, a Cuban singer who lived in France, visited Cuba and told the struggling Amenaza group about his interest in recording some songs with them. In 1997 they won the first prize in the 3rd edition of the underground Cuban Rap Music Awards, later on that year they would record a demo produced by X Alfonso. This first group had a very good acceptance and a lot of radio play in Cuba and some national television appearances in Cuba. From all this found fame they meet Petra Morales a representative of a French non-profit organization called ADHESIF, she liked their work so she arranged for them to travel to France from Cuba to do a cultural exchange program and to promote them outside Cuba.

While in France very few things were being done regarding the group, they had very few events and shows planned and it seemed that they did not agree with the same special requirements they had for them, one thing led to another and the band ended up homeless in the streets of Paris for about a month, they would eat at friends homes and back to sleeping in the Paris Métro.

There was already a strong rap music scene in Paris and they took advantage of this, they got together with Livan and the producer Niko Noki introduced them to another singer named Roldan at a club called Cupol and from that moment the group Orishas was born. Right away they started writing lyrics and musical themes for the demo that would later become their first album titled A Lo Cubano.

Since then Yotuel has not stopped working. He has worked on three television series La Casa de los Lios and Cuando Yo Sea Grande (Peruvian TV) and in Spain Un Paso Adelante. Movies include the features Color Habana and Perfecto Amor Equivocado and Chico Nuevo en la Ciudad . He has also starred in ad campaigns for Ducados and Havana Club. His work with Orishas went on with Emigrante (2002), El Kilo (2005), Antidiótico (2007), Cosita Buena (2008) and again with Gourmet (2018).

Besides being a singer, actor and a fashion model, Yotuel has also done work as a composer and record producer. He has worked as a record producer on two songs El rey de la pachanga and Distinto from the recordings Emigrante and El Kilo respectively. On 2019, Yotuel released the song "Insomnio"  after receiving images of the struggles that Cubans in the island were going through. "Tell me if sleeping is easy for you, tell me if waking up is not the way out," sings the Cuban group Orishas in "Insomnia," a song composed by Yotuel.

In February 2021 the song "Patria y Vida" was released by Yotuel, Descemer Bueno, Gente de Zona, Luis Manuel Otero Alcántara, Maykel Osorbo and DJ El Funky. It was composed by all of them and Beatriz Luengo. The song became a hit and the slogan "Patria y Vida" ("Homeland and Life") was associated with the July 2021 Cuban protests. It is an inversion of the Cuban Revolution motto Patria o Muerte ("Homeland or Death"). The song and the artists, including Yotuel, were criticized in the Cuban mass media. It won the Latin Grammy Awards for Song of the Year and Best Urban Song.

In June 2021 the song "Juntos somos más" by Yotuel, Lara Álvarez and Beatriz Luengo was released as the anthem for the Spanish football tem during  2020 UEFA European Football Championship that wast postponed to summer 2021 due to the COVID-19 pandemic in Europe.

In September 2022, Yotuel teamed up with the department store Macy's to release a limited-edition capsule celebrating Hispanic Heritage Month.

Personal life
Yotuel Romero has a son, named Yotuelito (born in June 2000), from a previous relationship.

In September 2003, he started dating fellow Spanish actress and singer Beatriz Luengo. They both first met on the set of Un Paso Adelante earlier that same year. They secretly got married on 16 November 2008. Luengo gave birth to their son, named Angelo, on 20 August 2015. In December 2020, the couple announced that Luengo is five months pregnant with their second child together, a baby girl. Luengo gave to their girl, named Zoë, on 11 April 2021.

Filmography

Perfecto Amor Equivocado (2004) aka Love by Mistake (USA) as Leoncio

Television
Un Paso Adelante (2002–2005) TV Series (2003–2004) as Pavel

Discography
 2013 – Suerte

Singles
 2013 – Me Gusta
 2013 – Suerte

References

External links

1976 births
Living people
21st-century Cuban male actors
21st-century Cuban male singers
Cuban male film actors
Cuban male television actors
Cuban rappers
Cuban people of African descent
Latin music songwriters
Latin Grammy Award winners
People from Havana